Standard is an unincorporated community in LaSalle Parish, Louisiana, United States.

Notable person
Former Louisiana State Representative Evelyn Blackmon from West Monroe, was born in Standard in 1924.

Notes

Unincorporated communities in LaSalle Parish, Louisiana
Unincorporated communities in Louisiana